Kevin Gregory Joseph Morrison (born October 28, 1949) is a Canadian former professional ice hockey player who played 418 games in the World Hockey Association (WHA) and 41 games in the National Hockey League (NHL) between 1973 and 1980, scoring a total of 97 goals and 235 assists.

Career
Morrison was scouted while playing high school hockey for Sydney Academy and junior hockey for Saint-Jérôme Alouettes. He was drafted in the third round of the 1969 NHL Entry Draft by the New York Rangers. After two seasons in the Eastern Hockey League and Central Hockey League, he advanced to the American Hockey League (AHL), playing for the Rochester Americans and Tidewater Wings, scoring two goals for the former. Morrison spent the following season with the New Haven Nighthawks of the AHL, tallying 7 goals and 28 assists.

Despite solid offensive ability, Morrison was mostly known as an enforcer who was involved in a number of memorable hockey fights. During his season with the Nighthawks, he tangled with Rochester's J. Bob "Battleship" Kelly in what some, including Rochester coach Don Cherry, have called one of the greatest fights in hockey history. Both combatants fought furiously until exhausted, had a brief respite, then continued until neither man could punch anymore.

Morrison spent the next five seasons, from 1973 to 1978, exclusively in the World Hockey Association. He scored better than 20 goals in his first three seasons in the league and was selected to the one WHA All-Star game. He was involved in another memorable fight during the 1978–79 season against Steve Durbano of the Birmingham Bulls. In this skirmish, even after Morrison was assessed a penalty and standing in the penalty box, Durbano continued to go after him. Durbano broke free of the linesman holding him back and took several wild swings at Morrison, who himself broke free of the other linesman and decked his opponent with a clean right that sent Durbano crumpling to the ice.

Splitting 1978-79 between the AHL and WHA, Morrison recorded the only assist on Wayne Gretzky's first professional goal on October 20, 1978, against Edmonton Oilers goalie Dave Dryden. Morrison spent half his final year in pro hockey playing in the NHL for the Colorado Rockies. In 41 NHL games he scored 4 goals and added 11 assists.

Personal life
Morrison retired from senior hockey in 1986 and, lives in his hometown of Sydney, Nova Scotia.

Career statistics

Regular season and playoffs

External links

1949 births
Living people
Canadian ice hockey left wingers
Canadian people of Scottish descent
Colorado Rockies (NHL) players
Fort Worth Wings players
Fort Worth Texans players
Ice hockey people from Nova Scotia
Indianapolis Racers players
Jersey Knights players
New Haven Blades players
New Haven Nighthawks players
New York Golden Blades players
New York Rangers draft picks
Omaha Knights (CHL) players
People from Sydney, Nova Scotia
Philadelphia Firebirds (AHL) players
Quebec Nordiques (WHA) players
Rochester Americans players
San Diego Mariners players
Sportspeople from the Cape Breton Regional Municipality
Tidewater Wings players